Tunveer Mohyuddin Gillani (born 17 February 1969) is a Pakistani chess player who is three-times Pakistani Chess Championship winner (1991, 2004, 2006). He is Chess Olympiad individual gold medal winner (2006).

Biography
Tunveer Mohyuddin Gillani three times won Pakistani Chess Championship: in 1991, 2004, and 2006. In 2009, in New Delhi he participated in World Chess Championship Asian Zonal 3.2 Tournament and ranked 8th.

Tunveer Mohyuddin Gillani played for Pakistan in the Chess Olympiads:
 In 1992, at first board in the 30th Chess Olympiad in Manila (+6, =1, -5),
 In 2000, at second board in the 34th Chess Olympiad in Istanbul (+3, =5, -4),
 In 2004, at first board in the 36th Chess Olympiad in Calvià (+3, =2, -6),
 In 2006, at first board in the 37th Chess Olympiad in Turin (+6, =2, -0) and won individual gold medal,
 In 2010, at fourth board in the 39th Chess Olympiad in Khanty-Mansiysk (+3, =2, -6).

References

External links

Tunveer Mohyuddin Gillani chess games at 365chess.com

1969 births
Living people
People from Lahore
Pakistani chess players
Chess Olympiad competitors